Mikhail Albertovich Murashko (born 9 January 1967) is a Russian physician and a politician, serving as the Minister of Health of the Russian Federation since 21 January 2020.

Biography
Born in Sverdlovsk, he graduated from a city school with an in-depth study of physics, mathematics and chemistry. From 1986 to 1988, he served in the Internal Troops of the USSR Ministry of Internal Affairs. In 1992, he graduated from the Ural State Medical University, after which until 1996 he worked as an intern doctor and obstetrician-gynecologist at the Republican Hospital of the Komi Republic in Syktyvkar. In 1996, he was successively appointed deputy chief doctor for consultative and diagnostic work, and then chief doctor of the Komi Republican Perinatal Center. 

He defended his thesis on the topic "Features of the course and outcomes of childbirth in women with certain types of urogenital infection". From 1996 to 1999, he served as the chief physician of the Republican Medical Association. From 2000 to 2006, he worked as the chief physician of the Republican Perinatal Center. In 2006, he moved to the civil service, taking the post of Minister of Health of the Komi Republic. In parallel with this, in 2011 and 2012 he headed the Department of Obstetrics and Gynecology of the Republican Branch of the Kirov State Medical University of the Ministry of Health and Social Development of Russia, located in Syktyvkar.

In 2012, he was appointed Deputy Head of the Federal Service for Supervision of Healthcare (Roszdravnadzor). Since 2013, he was temporarily acting head of the department, and on 14 July 2015 he officially headed Roszdravnadzor. Under his leadership, Roszdravnadzor created a modern service for state control of the quality of medicines, one of the advanced systems for monitoring the circulation of medical devices and monitoring the quality and safety of medical care for the population. The Federal Service for Supervision of Healthcare has reached a high international level, its employees are heads of expert structures of international organizations at the World Health Organization and the Council of Europe.

On 21 January, he was appointed by presidential decree signed by President Vladimir Putin to the Minister of Health of the Russian Federation in Mikhail Mishustin's Cabinet.

References 

Living people
1967 births
21st-century Russian politicians
Politicians from Yekaterinburg
Recipients of the Medal of the Order "For Merit to the Fatherland" II class
Health ministers of Russia
Russian obstetricians